The Catholic Guy Show is a radio talk show currently aired on The Catholic Channel on Sirius XM Radio, a subscription-based satellite radio service, since December 4, 2006.  Hosted by Lino Rulli, Emmy Award-winning Catholic personality, The Catholic Guy show discusses life, religion, and theology in a humorous fashion through the eyes of an average Catholic guy. 

The show has been recognized by The New York Times for its spontaneity and edginess, having ability to sound like catechism class one minute and The Howard Stern Show the next.

History
It was first announced in May 2006 that The Catholic Channel would come to Sirius Satellite Radio later that year; the channel's purpose was to spread  the Word in a new way. It then was announced that Emmy Award-winning television host Lino Rulli would host the afternoon drive show (4–7 PM Eastern) on the new channel. The first broadcast of the show was on December 4, 2006 with Rulli alongside producer Maureen McMurray, technical director Lou Ruggieri, and phone screener Tom Falcone. Frequent appearances were also made by program director Ron Astorino. Father Jim Chern also began to appear frequently after his well reception from playing the game "Push-ups for Prayers".

In 2008, Falcone was the first of the original four crew members to depart from the show. Christine Stern/Lloyd became the new phone screener until 2009. McMurray left later that year to pursue a career with NPR, then later Martha Stewart Living Radio. The show was then introduced to Father Rob Keighron, who first appeared as a guest but began making weekly appearances. Ryan Stewart briefly filled the producer void in 2008, followed by Jared Rizzi until he departed in 2009. McMurray went on to return to the show in September 2009. Rulli described the show as being back to "the way it was ever meant to be" with himself, Ruggieri, and McMurray broadcasting together until 2011.

In April 2011, Rulli announced that long-time assistant producer/technical director Lou Ruggieri would depart from the show. Ryan Grant was hired in May to work alongside McMurray as assistant producer. Less than a month after Grant was hired, McMurray again left the show. Rulli and Grant continued to broadcast each day with frequent appearances by Father Rob Keighron. It was announced in September 2011 that Keighron would join the show full-time and serve as co-host alongside Rulli, as well as co-producer. Grant left the show in late 2011. In late 2012, the show moved to a new slot, live Monday–Thursday from 5–7 PM Eastern, and Friday from 11 AM–1 PM Eastern.

On October 10, 2013 Father Rob Keighron announced his departure as co-host; his final full-time show was October 25. Rulli then announced his plans to change the format of the show, leaving the New York City studio to broadcast from a different city each week to focus on individual Catholic ministries. Keighron continued to make periodic in-studio guest appearances with Rulli until June 19, 2014, when he announced his full departure from the show and active ministry. Following the format change, the show began to broadcast only Monday–Thursday from 5–7 PM Eastern, with no live show on Fridays; however in January 2015, the show moved back to its former slot (live Monday–Friday from 5–7 PM Eastern).

In September 2016, Rulli announced another format change. After three years of broadcasting the show on the road, Rulli returned to New York to broadcast daily shows from his apartment. This format featured rotating co-hosts Mark Hart and Father Jim Chern. Both longtime periodic guests, Hart and Chern joined the show full-time, with Hart co-hosting three days per week and Chern two.  Hart had been with the show since the first week of its existence, and Chern first appeared in August 2007.  Chern originally got Sirius XM to listen to Howard Stern, and eventually stumbled upon Rulli's show where "for about 15 minutes, [he] couldn't tell if the show was pro-Catholic or anti-Catholic." This format continued until Chern's announced departure on June 6, 2019. A similar format still exists after Rulli's 2020 move to Minnesota. Hart remained as co-host until his departure of the full-time role in September 2022. Rulli currently hosts the show five days per week with producer Tyler as co-host, with occasional appearances by assistant producer Chuck.

Show content and format
The Catholic Guy consists of an average "Catholic guy" (Rulli) discussing both current events and personal religious issues in a humorous (and sometimes off-color) light.

2006–2013
The original format was featured during its first seven years. The show would begin with Rulli discussing something on his mind, followed by callers' input and opinions. This usually led into many different segments, which could be caller input discussions, games in which callers won religious prizes, or in-studio guests. The show featured a relatively small number of celebrity guests during its original format run, with notable guests appearing once every few months on average during that time.

2013–2016
Following the departure of his co-host Father Rob Keighron in October 2013, Rulli announced a new format for The Catholic Guy. In the new format, each week Rulli travels around the world to various outreach ministries, colleges, youth organizations, and other Catholic institutions. In each show, he discussed the organization by often featuring co-hosts and guests, adding humor to the discussions.

2016–present
After Rulli married in 2016, The Catholic Guy ended its tenure of travelling throughout the world for broadcasts. Rulli returned to New York to broadcast shows in a similar style to the 2006–2013 format (featuring various segments, games, and occasional guests). The same format still exists presently after Rulli's move to Minnesota in 2020.

Opening theme music
"It's The Catholic Guy Show with Lino Rulli..." by Tyler Veghte (2017–present)
"My Hero" by Foo Fighters (2011–2017)
"Soul Bossa Nova" by Quincy Jones (2006–2011)

Cast, crew, and guests

Current crew members

 Lino Rulli – host (2006–present)
 Tyler Veghte – executive producer, co-host (2015–present)
 Chuck – "assistant to the executive producer" (2022–present)

Periodic co-hosts and guests
 Mark Hart ("Bible Geek", Executive Vice President of Life Teen) – periodic guest (2006–2016); co-host (2016–2022); periodic guest (2022–present)
 Tom Leopold (comedy writer) – (2012–present)
 Jennifer Fulwiler (author, former "The Catholic Channel" host) – (2014–present)
 Gina (Rulli's mom) – (2007–present)
 Jill (Rulli's wife) – (2015–present)

Past crew members and guests
 Father Jim Chern (priest, chaplain at Montclair State University, "America's Favorite College Campus Minister") – (2007–2019)
 Jonathan Morris (Fox News Channel analyst) – (2012–2018)
 Hallie Lord (author, "The Catholic Channel" host); periodic co-host – (2014–2018)
 Rob Keighron – weekly guest (2008–2011); co-host/co-producer (2011–2013); periodic guest (2013–2014; 2015)
 Lou Ruggieri – technical director (2006–2009); assistant producer (2009–2011); periodic co-host (2014–2016)
 Leah Darrow (model, Catholic speaker) – (2014–2016)
 Kerry Weber (America managing editor, "The Catholic Channel" periodic guest) – (2014–2016)
 Kayla Riley (host on Sirius XM's Octane, Ozzy's Boneyard & The Message Amped) – periodic guest (2007–2013)
 Scott Shea – co-producer (2011–2012)
 Ryan Grant – co-producer (2011)
 Maureen McMurray – producer (2006–2008, 2009–2011)
 Krista D'Amore – intern (Summer 2010)
 Ryan Stewart – producer (2008); periodic guest (2008–2010)
 Ron Astorino – "The Catholic Channel" program director (2006–2009)
 Jared Rizzi – producer (2008–2009)
 Christine Stern (aka Christine Lloyd) – phone screener (2008–2009)
 Tom "the Bird" Falcone – "Professional Phone Answerer" (2006–2008)
 Emily Dunning – intern (Summer 2008)
 Josh – producer (2006)

Recurring segments

Notable guests
Although Rulli often states he does not like having guests on the show, The Catholic Guy has featured many notable guests throughout its existence:

John L. Allen Jr. – journalist
Coffey Anderson – singer
Kurt Angle – professional wrestler
Jay Bakker – televangelist
Kelvin Beachum – football player
Jim Breuer – comedian
Sam Brownback – U.S. Representative, Kansas
Mark Burnett – television producer
Tia Carrere – actress/model/singer
Jim Caviezel – actor
Charles J. Chaput – Archbishop of Denver
Harry Connick Jr. – singer/actor
Tom Cotter – comedian
Tom Coughlin – football coach
Leah Darrow – model/speaker
Robert Davi – actor/singer
Gary Dell'Abate – The Howard Stern Show producer
Goo Goo Dolls – band
Timothy M. Dolan – Cardinal, Archbishop of New York
Roma Downey – actress/producer/singer
Edward Egan – Cardinal, Archbishop Emeritus of New York
Emilio Estevez – actor/director/author
Jars of Clay – band
Joe Eszterhas – screenwriter
Jim Florentine – comedian/actor
Nick Foles – football player, Super Bowl MVP
John Patrick Foley – Cardinal, Grand Master of the Order of the Holy Sepulchre
Rob Ford – former Mayor of Toronto
Stan Fortuna – priest/musician
Kirk Franklin – singer/author
Andy García – actor
Newt Gingrich – former Speaker of the House
Mark-Paul Gosselaar – actor
Bear Grylls – television presenter/author
Vinny Guadagnino – television personality/actor
Pete Holmes – comedian
Matt Hughes – mixed martial artist
Oscar Isaac – actor
Derek Jeter – baseball player
Renaldo Lapuz – singer
Sugar Ray Leonard – professional boxer
Ray Liotta – actor
Matt Maher – singer
Sebastian Maniscalco – comedian
Cheech Marin – comedian/actor/writer
Denis McDonough – former White House Chief of Staff
Ed McMahon – comedian
Chazz Palminteri – actor/author
Vincent Pastore – actor
Joseph A. Pepe –  Bishop of Las Vegas
Troy Polamalu – football player
Dennis Quaid – actor
Al Roker – weatherman/actor/author
Mike Rowe – reality television host
John Schneider – actor/singer
Paul Shaffer – musician/actor
Martin Sheen – actor/political activist
Joseph Simmons – rapper/reverend
Tom Sizemore – actor/producer
Luis Antonio Tagle – Cardinal, Archbishop of Manila
Tim Tebow – football player
Mark Wahlberg – actor
Nik Wallenda – daredevil
George Wendt – actor
Christopher West – author/speaker
Lisa Whelchel – actress/speaker

Special editions of The Catholic Guy
The Catholic Guy broadcast many shows from various locations throughout its incarnation. Prior to a format change in 2013, where Rulli broadcast from a different location each week, the show visited the following locations:

The show was put on temporary hiatus in March 2013 for the papal conclave. Before and during the conclave, Rulli hosted a special show titled Holy Smokes: The Road to the Papacy from Vatican City with Father Dave Dwyer, fellow Catholic Channel host. Father Rob Keighron also hosted the Papal Election Show from New York City, recapping each day's conclave news alongside Tom Leopold (also a Catholic Channel host).

References

External links
 Lino Rulli's official website

American talk radio programs
Catholic radio programs
American Christian radio programs